The 2002–03 NBA season was the Wizards' 42nd season in the National Basketball Association. During the off-season, the Wizards acquired All-Star guard Jerry Stackhouse from the Detroit Pistons, and signed free agents Larry Hughes, Bryon Russell, and Charles Oakley. Retired All-Star center Patrick Ewing was hired as the team's assistant coach. The Wizards got off to a 6–4 start to the season, but then struggled losing six straight games afterwards, and held a 24–25 record at the All-Star break. The team finished fifth in the Atlantic Division with a 37–45 record, which was the same as the previous season.

Stackhouse averaged 21.5 points and 4.5 assists per game, while Hughes averaged 12.8 points and 1.3 steals per game, and Tyronn Lue contributed 8.6 points and 3.5 assists per game. In addition, Christian Laettner provided the team with 8.3 points and 6.6 rebounds per game, while second-year forward Kwame Brown provided with 7.4 points and 5.3 rebounds per game, and second-year center Brendan Haywood contributed 6.2 points, 5.0 rebounds and 1.5 blocks per game.

This marked the final season for All-Star guard Michael Jordan, who retired for the third and final time, playing his final game in a 107–87 road loss to the Philadelphia 76ers on April 16, 2003. Jordan averaged 20.0 points, 6.1 rebounds, 3.8 assists and 1.5 steals per game in all 82 games, starting in 67 of them. He also made his final All-Star appearance in the 2003 NBA All-Star Game in Atlanta. Following the season, Russell signed as a free agent with the Los Angeles Lakers, while Tyronn Lue signed with the Orlando Magic, Oakley was released to free agency, and head coach Doug Collins was fired after two seasons. (See 2002–03 Washington Wizards season#Regular season)

Offseason

NBA draft

Roster

Regular season

Jordan announced he would return for the 2002–03 season, and this time he was determined to be equipped with reinforcements, as he traded for All-Star Jerry Stackhouse and signed budding star Larry Hughes. Jordan even accepted a sixth-man role on the bench in order for his knee to survive the rigors of an 82-game season. Heading into the season, as he was still dealing with injuries, Jordan started the first 15 games coming off from the bench. However, a combination of numerous team injuries and uninspired play led to Jordan's return to the starting lineup, where he tried to rebound the franchise from its early-season struggles after a 6–9 start. The move led to mixed results, as several of Jordan's younger teammates complained about playing in Jordan's shadow and his unfair expectations of them.

By the end of the season, the Wizards finished with a 37–45 record once again. At the age of 40, Jordan ended the season as the only Wizard to play in all 82 games, as he averaged 20.0 points, 6.1 rebounds, 3.8 assists, and 1.5 steals in 37.0 minutes per game. He also became the only 40 years old in NBA history to score over 40 points in a game, which he did several times during the season. In addition, Jordan became the oldest NBA player in NBA history to average at least 20 points at the age of 40. This was also the first season where Jordan was not the team's better scorer, as Stackhouse averaged 1.5 more point per game, but Jordan still led the team in steals at 1.5 per game, while Christian Laettner led the team in rebounds at 6.6, Stackhouse in assists at 4.5, and Brendan Haywood in blocks at 1.5.

After the season, Wizards' majority owner Abe Pollin fired Jordan as team president, much to the shock of teammates, associates, and the public. Jordan felt he was betrayed, thinking that he would get his ownership back after his playing days ended, but Pollin justified Jordan's dismissal by noting that Jordan had detrimental effects on the team, such as benching Larry Hughes for Tyronn Lue, making poor trades, and squandering the teams' first round pick at the 2001 NBA draft on high schooler Kwame Brown who never panned out. Without Jordan in the fold the following year, the Wizards were not expected to win, and they did not. Despite the signing of future All-Star point guard Gilbert Arenas, which had been made possible by Jordan's previous cap-clearing maneuvers as a team executive, the team stumbled to a 25–57 record in the 2003–04 season.

Jordan's stint with the Wizards was closely watched by both fans and the media. While the team failed to qualify for the playoffs in either of Jordan's two seasons as a player, the team was competitive and sold-out arenas around the league. The Wizards replaced Jordan's managerial role with general manager Ernie Grunfeld. Although the organization fielded a competitive team built around Arenas for several years, the team again stumbled into the lower echelon of the league in the years following Arenas' numerous off the court issues.

Record vs. opponents

Player stats
Note: GP= Games played; MPG= Minutes per Game; STL= Steals; RPG = Rebounds per Game; APG. = Assists per Game; BLK = Blocks; PPG = Points per Game

Award winners
 All-Star: Michael Jordan (14th)

References

 Washington Wizards on Database Basketball
 Washington Wizards on Basketball Reference

Washington Wizards seasons
Wash
Wash